The ID Integrity is a 26,070 gross ton, 45,653 deadweight ton bulk carrier, built in 1996 and managed by ID Wallem, Hong Kong. The ship was disabled and was in danger of hitting the Great Barrier Reef on 19 May 2012.

References

1996 ships